Kolah Boz-e Sharqi Rural District is in the Central District of Mianeh County, East Azerbaijan province, Iran. At the National Census of 2006, its population was 5,825 in 1,182 households. There were 5,209 inhabitants in 1,345 households at the following census of 2011. At the most recent census of 2016, the population of the rural district was 4,402 in 1,258 households. The largest of its 28 villages was Tavaq, with 1,961 people.

References 

Meyaneh County

Rural Districts of East Azerbaijan Province

Populated places in East Azerbaijan Province

Populated places in Meyaneh County